Eriauchenus milajaneae is a species of spider in the family Archaeidae. It is endemic to Madagascar.

Taxonomy 
The holotype was collected in the Parc National Andohahela. The specific name is after Mila Jane Macaulay. The genus name has also been incorrectly spelt "Eriauchenius".

Habitat and distribution 
The spider is found in montane rainforest.

References 

Archaeidae
Spiders described in 2018